West Ryder Pauper Lunatic Asylum is the third studio album by British indie rock band Kasabian, which was released on 5 June 2009. It was the band's first album not to feature Christopher Karloff, the band's lead guitarist and songwriter who departed during the writing stages of Empire (2006). Rhythm guitarist Sergio Pizzorno became lead songwriter and co-producer for the band. It is also their first album to feature guitar contributions from Tim Carter, who would become the band's touring guitarist in 2013 and a full-fledged member of the band in 2021.

West Ryder Pauper Lunatic Asylum debuted at number one in the United Kingdom, giving Kasabian their second number-one album in that country, and spawned four singles: "Fire", "Where Did All the Love Go?", "Underdog" and "Vlad the Impaler". It also charted within the top 40 in countries like Australia, France, Ireland and New Zealand.

The album was nominated for the 2009 Mercury Prize. In October 2009, it was voted the best album of the year by Q Magazine.

History
"Vlad the Impaler" was made available as a free download from the official website from 31 March to 3 April 2009. The first proper, physical release from the album was "Fire", which was released on 1 June. Sergio Pizzorno has called the 52-minute album "the soundtrack to an imaginary movie." The album includes a duet, on the track "West Ryder Silver Bullet", with the actress Rosario Dawson. The album entered the UK Album Chart at No. 1, giving the band their second No. 1 album.
"Underdog" has been used by Sony in a commercial for their BRAVIA Televisions.

Theme
The West Riding Pauper Lunatic Asylum was a mental institution built in West Yorkshire, England in 1818. Sergio Pizzorno further explained the choice of album title: "The album isn't about the place, I just first heard about it on a TV documentary, and the words just struck me. I love the way it looked and the feeling it evokes. Apparently, it was one of the first for the poor, before that it was mainly rich people who got treatment." The album cover depicts the band "getting dressed up for a party at the asylum, looking in the mirror at the costumes". Inspiration for the cover originated from the artwork of Amon Düül II's album Made in Germany. In an interview with T4, the band said that each track is meant to represent an inmate within the asylum.

Critical reception

West Ryder Pauper Lunatic Asylum received positive reviews from music critics. At Metacritic, which assigns a normalised rating out of 100 to reviews from mainstream critics, the album received an average score of 68, based on 15 reviews.

Adam Sweeting of Uncut praised the band for putting a lot more depth into their sound while delivering the songs with a dark undertone to them, calling it "A world away from their ladrock roots, you might say." Dave Simpson of The Guardian also gave praise to the band's newfound demented sound, noting that their trademark tracks are more melodic and utilize different instrumentals, concluding that "the resulting epic is barmy and beautiful, suggesting that while Kasabian's amps go up to 11, they can also sound good when they're turned down to four." Hamish MacBain of NME praised the album's mishmash of psychedelic-infused tracks resembling that of The Rolling Stones' Their Satanic Majesties Request, calling it "a shambling, splattered, ultimately much more enduring mess that will make sense if you just hang on in there."

Andrew Leahey of AllMusic commended the band for improving on their previous effort with a psychedelic sense and horror-like atmosphere mixed with their usual dance-rock sound, calling it "an interesting, unexpected piece of work, devoid of a militantly commercial single like Empires self-titled track, and lacking the shaggy Madchester vibes that Christopher Karloff brought to 2004's Kasabian." While praising tracks like "Fast Fuse" and "Ladies and Gentlemen (Roll the Dice)" for deviating away from their Madchester sound into more '60s sounding bands like the Stones and T-Rex, Dom Gourlay of Drowned in Sound criticized the album for carrying half thought-out tracks with production that apes the sounds of other well-known Britpop bands, saying that it "suffers in the most part for being so predictable." Bill Stewart of PopMatters felt the album was bogged down by the band's pretentious, instrumental choices and studio handling, saying that "All the gimmicky studio effects in the world can't mask the fact that this album is likely to be one of the most hollow you'll hear all year."

Singles and videos

 "Fast Fuse" – Released on 2 October 2007 as a bootleg single. Although not being the first official single from the album it was the first material released from it, receiving airplay on Xfm, Absolute Radio and being posted on YouTube. Members of Kasabian's fan club at the time could buy the song on a one sided 10". Despite receiving some airplay and a limited release it never had a video. It was also used on the video game FIFA 09. As well as this, the song was used as the theme tune for Russell Howard's Good News, broadcast on BBC Two (previously BBC Three) in the UK.
 "Vlad the Impaler" – Released as a free single on 31 March 2009 to 3 April 2009. The song only got minor airplay. The song was released with a video featuring Noel Fielding as Vlad. The video was directed by Richard Ayoade. It was later released on 14 February 2010 with a second music video to accompany it as the fourth official single.
 "Fire" – Released as the first official single on 1 June and reached number 3 on the UK Singles Chart.
 "Underdog" – Released on 26 October 2009 and reached number 32 in the UK Singles Chart.
 "Where Did All the Love Go?" – Released on 17 August 2009, the song was the third official single charting at 30 in the UK charts. A music video has been released to support the single.

Track listing

Personnel
Kasabian
Tom Meighan – lead vocals (all tracks except "Swarfiga", "Take Aim", "Secret Alphabets" and "Happiness"), scream on "Swarfiga"
Sergio Pizzorno – lead and rhythm guitar, synths, programming, backing vocals, lead vocals on "Take Aim", "Secret Alphabets" and "Happiness"
Chris Edwards – bass guitar
Ian Matthews – drums

Additional personnel
Dan the Automator – additional programming
Jay Mehler – additional guitar on "Underdog", "Ladies and Gentlemen (Roll the Dice)" and "Happiness"
Tim Carter – additional guitar, keyboards and percussion
Daniel Ralph Martin – additional guitar on "Fast Fuse" and piano on "Happiness"
Rosario Dawson – co-lead vocals on "West Ryder Silver Bullet"
Ben Kealey – additional keyboards on "Ladies and Gentlemen (Roll the Dice)"
Rosie Danvers – strings direction
Wired Strings – strings on "Where Did All the Love Go?", "Take Aim", "West Ryder Silver Bullet" & "Secret Alphabets"

Charts and certifications

Weekly charts

Year-end charts

Certifications

References

2009 albums
Kasabian albums
Albums produced by Dan the Automator
Space rock albums
Experimental rock albums by English artists
Psychedelic rock albums by English artists